The 2016 BC Lions season was the 59th season for the team in the Canadian Football League and their 63rd overall. The Lions finished in 2nd place in the West Division and finished with a 12–6 record. It was only the third time in franchise history that the Lions had finished in second place, and the first time they have done so since 1986. In each of those three years, the Lions hosted and defeated the Winnipeg Blue Bombers in the West Semi-Final.

This was the team's second stint under now tenth-year head coach, Wally Buono, and his 14th season as the general manager. Buono took over the position following Jeff Tedford's resignation on December 2, 2015. The Lions improved upon their 7–11 record from 2015 and qualified for the playoffs for the 20th straight year, which is the second-longest streak in CFL history. After winning the West Semi-Final against the Blue Bombers, the Lions lost to the Calgary Stampeders in the West Final.

For the seventh consecutive season, the Lions held their training camp at Hillside Stadium in Kamloops, British Columbia with rookie camp beginning Wednesday, May 25 and main camp beginning on Sunday, May 29.

Offseason

Free agents

CFL draft
The 2016 CFL Draft took place on May 10, 2016. The Lions had eight picks in the draft, including two fourth round selections from Hamilton and the loss of their fifth round pick in a trade for Tim O'Neill.

Preseason

 Games played with colour uniforms.

Regular season

Standings

Schedule

 Games played with colour uniforms.
 Games played with white uniforms.

Post-season

Schedule 

 Games played with colour uniforms.
 Games played with white uniforms.

Team

Roster

Coaching staff

References

BC Lions seasons
2016 Canadian Football League season by team
BC Lions